McGill Institute for the Study of Canada (MISC) is a nonpartisan Canadian think tank established in 1994 with support from the Bronfman family and McGill University. Along with its academic program, MISC hosts annual conferences and other large-scale activities that are open to the public. MISC research and public events focuses on topics of interest to Canadians such as taxation and elections.

History
MISC was established in 1994 with support from the Bronfman family and McGill University with Desmond Morton as Founding Director.

Mandate
According to its website, MISC's mission is to "promote a better understanding of Canada through the study of our heritage; develop a clearer understanding of Canada's social, political and economic future; identify and explore the benefits that a pluralistic society offers; [and] support the study of Canada across the country and internationally."

Key people
The Founding Director was Desmond Morton, who served from MISC's creation in 1994 until 2001. Past Directors include Antonia Maioni, who served from 2001 until 2011;  Will Straw, who served from 2011 to 2016; and Andrew Potter who served from August 2016 until March 2017. Suzanne Morton, who is now an editor at Canadian Historical Review, served as Acting Director in 2014. Elsbeth Heaman has been the interim Director since Potter's departure.

Conferences
MISC holds an annual conference in Montreal at McGill University. The theme for the 2018 conference held from February 21–23, 2018 at McGill, was "Who pays for Canada? Taxes and Fairness".

On June 19, 2018, MISC and the Canadian Municipal Election Study (CMES) co-sponsored the 2018 Canadian Municipal Election Study conference on the theme of 'Montreal and Quebec in Focus' which included a session entitled, "Does the Left–Right Axis Matter in Municipal Elections?"

The MISC Annual Conference 2017 held on February 10, 2017, entitled, "The Theory of Canadian Exceptionalism", featured presentations by University of California at Berkeley's Irene Bloemraad,  University of Toronto's Joseph Heath, and University of California San Diego's Andy Lamey.

The theme for 2016 was "Canada on the Global Stage: Exploring Canada's Image and Role in the World". Featured speakers included Inuit Circumpolar Conference (ICC)'s Okalik Eegeesiak, Kenneth Frankel, and Kathryn White.

Selected publications
In his MISC study, University of Toronto's political science professor, Michael Donnelly, concluded that there is potential in Canada for an increase in intolerance and an anti-immigrate/refugee stance. Donnelly's used data from a January 18–27, 2017, Ipsos poll which surveyed 1,522 Canadians.

The Andrew Potter affair

Andrew Potter resigned as MISC director in response to harsh criticism of his March 2017 article published in Maclean's describing an alleged malaise in Quebec society, some of which Potter later refuted. Potter's "sweeping and unflattering comments about Quebec society" went viral.  Quebec's premier and finance minister along with the federal heritage minister, "decried" the article and called for Potter's removal as MISC Director. McGill University immediately "disavowed" the article. Potter admitted to "errors" and produced "corrigenda." In a March 2017 article in The Walrus, Jonathan Kay described how MISC, is faced with a difficult choice in choosing the next Director. Kay described how MISC will face challenges in dealing with topical issues because of its location within an elite university setting, with a long history of public research and numerous funding partners—corporate and government. The next MISC director could be based on the Straw model, Potter's or in-between—a "journalist with centrist, institutional tendencies". Len Findlay, from Ryerson University's Centre for Free Expression (CFE) noted errors were made by all parties and called on MISC to rehire Potter as Director and to "become as it claims to be, "no stranger to debate and controversy", to use "rebuttal, not reprisal".

References

Think tanks based in Canada
McGill University
Canadian studies
Bronfman family
1994 establishments in Quebec
Organizations based in Montreal